The broccoli mandate, also known as the broccoli test, broccoli argument, broccoli hypothetical or broccoli horrible, was an argument used by those opposed to healthcare reform in the United States proposed by Barack Obama, who was then the President of the United States.

Use in 2012 Supreme Court summation

The so-called broccoli mandate was referenced by the conservative Supreme Court Justice Antonin Scalia in 2012, in his summation against healthcare reform. On March 27 of that year, Justice Scalia asked Donald B. Verrilli Jr., a lawyer for the Obama administration, to defend the individual shared responsibility provision (commonly called the individual mandate) of the ACA, saying to Verrilli: 

Opponents of reform – such as Justice Scalia – say that it should not be compulsory for American people to purchase health insurance under the Affordable Care Act (ACA) just because it is beneficial, otherwise, an enforcement body could similarly mandate Americans to buy broccoli because of its benefits to human health, which they say is an example of over-reaching authority. It has been described as a form of the slippery slope and reductio ad absurdum arguments.

Supporters of the individual mandate have questioned this analogy. For example, Verrilli told Justice Scalia that the health care market is unique and:

Legacy
Use of the so-called 'broccoli mandate' in the summations of conservative justices in the National Federation of Independent Business v. Sebelius (NFIB) case was said to have:

See also
 George H. W. Bush broccoli comments

References

American phraseology
Law of the United States
Brassica
Affordable Care Act
Metaphors referring to food and drink
Food politics